Figgjoelva or Figgjo is a river in Rogaland county, Norway. It then heads north into the municipality of Sandnes before heading west. For a while, the river forms the municipal border between Sandnes and Time and between Sandnes and Klepp. The last part of the river runs west through Klepp before emptying into the North Sea. The Feistein Lighthouse lies on a small island, just northwest of the mouth of the river.

The river was developed for power generation as early as 1870, but the many small power plants that were built are now mostly closed.  The plants led to the development of several industries, particularly in Ålgård.  The Aalgaards Uldvarefabrikker, a large wool-textile company based in Ålgård was established in 1870 along with the first power stations.

Historically, the river was also fished for eels. The invasive species, Elodea canadensis (pondweed) has been detected in the river Figgjo as has agricultural pollution, both of which may affect the quality and quantity of fish life in the river.

See also
List of rivers in Norway

References

Gjesdal
Rivers of Rogaland
Rivers of Norway